An antitrichomonal agent is an antiprotozoal agent that acts on trichomonas parasites.

Examples include:
 furazolidone
 nifuratel
 nimorazole
 ornidazole
 tinidazole
 usnic acid

References

Antiprotozoal agents